The Simplo was an American high wheeler automobile manufactured from 1908 until 1909 by the Cook Motor Vehicle Company in St. Louis, Missouri.

History 
Cook Motor Vehicle Company of St. Louis advertised the Simplo as The biggest automobile value in America.  Several variations were offered; air or water-cooled 2-cylinder engines and both solid or pneumatic tires. The Simplo featured a friction transmission, double chain drive and right-hand wheel steering on the runabout, priced at $600, .

In 1909, roadster and surrey models were added, but after a year of trying, the Cook Motor Vehicle Company decided to become a multi-marque automobile dealership.

References 

Defunct motor vehicle manufacturers of the United States
Coachbuilders of the United States
Vehicle manufacturing companies established in 1908
Vehicle manufacturing companies disestablished in 1909
Motor vehicle manufacturers based in Missouri
Cars introduced in 1908
Highwheeler
Brass Era vehicles
1900s cars